Savanah Jayn Uveges (born June 9, 1996) is an American professional soccer player who plays as a midfielder for MSV Duisburg in the German 2. Bundesliga.

Early life 
Uveges grew up in Bartlett, Illinois and was a two-sport athlete in soccer and basketball at South Elgin High School. She set several school records including most goals in a in a season (23) and most goals in a game (5). She was an all-conference, all-area and all-sectional selection.

Nebraska Cornhuskers 
Uveges played college soccer for the Nebraska Cornhuskers between 2014 and 2019. After suffering two ACL tears while in high school, Uveges suffered another two in college, keeping her sidelined and unable to make an appearance in her first three seasons with the team. As a junior Uveges made 17 appearances, scoring her first career goal on August 25, 2017 in a 3–0 win over South Dakota Coyotes. As a senior, Uveges started in all 21 games during the 2018 season and received third-team All-Big Ten honors. Injury sidelined Uveges for much of 2019, limiting her to six appearances.

Professional career

Orlando Pride 
Uveges declared for the 2020 NWSL College Draft but was not selected. In February 2020 she briefly spent some time on trial in Sweden with second-tier Elitettan team IFK Kalmar, playing in a preseason friendly against Lidköping FK.

Uveges returned to the United States in March 2020, joining NWSL team Orlando Pride as a preseason trialist. However, preseason was canceled three days into camp amid the COVID-19 pandemic. On 8 September 2020, with the 2020 NWSL season dealing with significant disruption during the pandemic, Uveges was one of seven players signed to a short-term contract with Orlando in order to compete in the Fall Series following the team's decision to loan out 11 senior players to play regularly overseas. Uveges made her debut on September 26, 2020, starting in a 3–1 defeat to Houston Dash. She appeared in two Fall Series matches for a combined 56 minutes.

MSV Duisburg 
On July 24, 2021, Uveges signed for German 2. Bundesliga side MSV Duisburg.

Career statistics

Club

References

External links 
 Nebraska profile
 NWSL profile
 

1996 births
Living people
American women's soccer players
Orlando Pride players
MSV Duisburg (women) players
National Women's Soccer League players
2. Frauen-Bundesliga players
Women's association football midfielders
Nebraska Cornhuskers women's soccer players
American expatriate soccer players in Germany
American expatriate women's soccer players